The 2021–22 Memphis Tigers men's basketball team represented the University of Memphis in the 2021–22 NCAA Division I men's basketball season. The Tigers were led by fourth-year head coach Penny Hardaway. The team played their home games at FedExForum as members of the American Athletic Conference. They finished the season 22–11, 13–5 in AAC Play to finish in 3rd place. They defeated UCF and SMU to advance to the championship game of the AAC tournament where they lost to Houston. They received an at-large bid to the NCAA tournament as the No. 9 seed in the West Region, where they defeated Boise State in the First Round before losing in the Second Round to Gonzaga.

Previous season
The Tigers finished the 2020–21 season 20–8, 11–4 in AAC play, finishing in third place. They entered as the No. 3 seed in the AAC tournament, where they would lose to No. 2 seed Houston in the semifinals. They were selected as a No. 1 seed in the NIT. The Tigers would go on to win the tournament, their second overall, and first since 2002.

Offseason
On June 11, 2021, speculation emerged that Penny Hardaway was a candidate for multiple head coaching jobs in the NBA including his former team, the Orlando Magic. On June 28, reports emerged that Hardaway had in fact interviewed and emerged as a top candidate for the vacant head coaching job.  Two days later, via Instagram, Hardaway confirmed he was not leaving the University of Memphis, and reports emerged that Hall of Fame coach Larry Brown had accepted an offer to be his assistant.

Departing players

Incoming transfers

2021 recruiting class

Preseason

AAC preseason media poll

On October 13, The American released the preseason Poll and other preseason awards

Preseason Awards
 AAC Preseason Rookie of the Year - Jalen Duren
 AAC Preseason All-Conference First Team - Jalen Duren
 AAC Preseason All-Conference First Team - Landers Nolley II
 AAC Preseason All-Conference Second Team - Emoni Bates
 AAC Preseason All-Conference Second Team - DeAndre Williams

Roster

Schedule and results

|-
!colspan=12 style=| Exhibition

|-
!colspan=12 style=| Non-conference regular season

|-
!colspan=12 style=| AAC regular season

|-
!colspan=12 style=| AAC Tournament

|-
!colspan=12 style=|NCAA tournament

Source

Awards and honors

American Athletic Conference honors

All-AAC Awards
Freshman of the Year: Jalen Duren

All-AAC First Team
Jalen Duren

All-AAC Second Team
DeAndre Williams

All-AAC Freshman Team
Jalen Duren
Josh Minott

Source

Rankings

*AP does not release post-NCAA Tournament rankings^Coaches did not release a week 1 poll.

References

Memphis
Memphis Tigers men's basketball seasons
Memphis
Memphis
Memphis